The Mont Bessou viewing tower is a purpose-built panoramic tower, north of the town of Meymac in the Corrèze department of the Limousin (region) of France

Location
The tower is situated in the Forest of Mirambel, on the raised south-eastern edge of the Plateau de Millevaches. It is set in an area of woodland belonging jointly to the department of Corrèze and the commune of Meymac, at an altitude of approximately 1000 metres. It overlooks and affords wide vistas across the lower area between the plateau and the Cantal mountains. Both the town of Meymac and the more distant and larger town of Ussel are easily visible.

History
The tower was planned on the initiative of the departmental and regional councils. The consulting architect was François Bonnin. It was opened on 17 June 2005.

Construction
The construction of the tower was deliberately planned as a bringing together of modern design and traditional local materials.

Gallery

External links

  Meymac and the Mont Bessou, its observation tower, photos of the panorama and the surroundings

Buildings and structures in Corrèze
Massif Central
Towers in France
Tourist attractions in Corrèze